Mirage is a 1995 action-thriller film  directed  by Paul Williams and starred by Edward James Olmos and Sean Young.

Plot
There's this detective dude who's hired to follow some guy's wife because she keeps getting herself into trouble. She suffers from severe headaches and loss of memory. She never seems to know what's going on. it turns out she's got a split personality. This split personality is the one getting her in trouble.

Cast
  Edward James Olmos as Matteo Juarez 
  Sean Young as Jennifer Gale 
  James Andronica as Lt. Richie Randazzo
   Paul Williams as Donald Gale
  Sayed Badreya as Sayed 
  Eric Morris as The Police Captain 
  Susan Helen Emerson   as  Miranda Randazzo  
   William Grillo 	  as Carmine Randazzo
  Tony King as Nude Bar Tall Thug

Reception
Emanuel Levy of Variety wrote that "Alfred Hitchcock deserves better than the atrocious homage he gets in Paul Williams Mirage, an incoherent thriller that can’t decide whether to slavishly copy Hitchcock’s Vertigo or make a satire out of it. Preposterous plotting and radical changes in tone dictate the fate of this routine B picture as straight-to-video. Closing-night selection of the Palm Springs Film Festival was greeted with laughter and sneers by a bewildered audience."

J.R Taylor of Entertainment Weekly said that "Ultimately, all this convolution leads to a cliffside climax so amusingly absurd it’s worth the rental fee."

References

External links

1995 action thriller films
1995 films
American action thriller films
Films directed by Paul Williams
1990s English-language films
1990s American films